The shooting at the 1948 Summer Olympics in London consisted of four events. The competitions were held from 2 to 6 August 1948.

Medal summary

Participating nations
A total of 188 shooters from 28 nations competed at the London Games:

Medal count

References

External links
Official Olympic Report

 
1948 Summer Olympics events
1948
Olympics
Shooting competitions in the United Kingdom